Gymnastics at the 2010 South American Games in Medellín was held from March 22 to March 29. All events were competed at Coliseo de Gimnasia.

Medal summary

Medal table

Gymnastics Artistic 

This event was held from 22 March to 24 March.

Men

Women

Gymnastics Rhythmic 

The events were held from 27 March to 29 March.

Medalists

References

2010 South American Games
South American Games
2010 South American Games